Samuel Herman Friedman (February 20, 1897 – March 17, 1990) was an American journalist and a longtime labor union activist. He twice ran unsuccessfully for Vice President of the United States on the Socialist Party of America ticket.

Friedman was born in February 1897 in Denver, Colorado.

In the 1952 United States presidential election, the Socialist National Party Congress nominated Friedman to run alongside its presidential candidate, Darlington Hoopes. They won 20,203 votes in 1952 and received 2,044 votes in 1956. Friedman frequently ran in New York for state senator, lieutenant governor, New York City controller and City Council president. Friedman never won. 

He earned his living as a journalist and public relations agent. Friedman was also an early member of and longtime visitor to the Three Arrows Cooperative Society.

Friedman died in March 1990 in New York City from pneumonia. He was 93.

Notes

External links 
 "Samuel H. Friedman, 93, Editor And Ex-Socialist Party Candidate" New York Times March 19, 1990

1897 births
1990 deaths
1952 United States vice-presidential candidates
1956 United States vice-presidential candidates
American male journalists
Trade unionists from New York (state)
Journalists from New York City
Socialist Party of America politicians from New York (state)
Socialist Party of America vice presidential nominees
Writers from New York City
Deaths from pneumonia in New York City